Bruce A. Salzburg (born July 11, 1947) was the 34th Wyoming Attorney General. He was appointed by the Governor of Wyoming in August 2007. His predecessor was Patrick J. Crank. He was succeeded by Greg Phillips in 2011.

References

External links 
 http://attorneygeneral.state.wy.us/basbio.htm
 Project VoteSmart entry for Bruce A. Salzburg

Wyoming Attorneys General
1947 births
Living people